Monadnock State Park in Jaffrey, New Hampshire, United States, is a  state park located on and around  Mount Monadnock. The park is surrounded by thousands of acres of protected highlands.

The park is open to hiking, picnicking, camping, backpacking, snowshoeing and cross country skiing. Backcountry skiing is possible on some of the lower trails. There are two campgrounds.

A per-person fee is charged (in season) to park at the Old Toll Road and State Park Headquarters trailheads. There are no roads to the summit, and the Old Toll Road, which leads to the Halfway House site, is closed to vehicles.

In 1987, Mount Monadnock was designated a National Natural Landmark.

References

External links
Monadnock State Park New Hampshire Department of Natural and Cultural Resources

State parks of New Hampshire
Parks in Cheshire County, New Hampshire
Jaffrey, New Hampshire